The Liberty Humane Society is an animal shelter and humane society in New Jersey.

Overview
The Liberty Humane Society (LHS) was created in 1998 to work in partnership with Jersey City to build and manage an animal shelter. Jersey City had previously contracted with the Hudson County SPCA to provide it with animal sheltering services, but the SPCA was deemed unsatisfactory. In 2002, after a state investigation revealed numerous abuses, mismanagement, and financial misdealings at the SPCA, the city dropped its contract and opened its own animal shelter in a converted garage. The Liberty Humane Society provided volunteer and financial support, and participated in managerial and hiring decisions with the city.

On November 1, 2004, management of Jersey City's animal shelter officially transferred to the Liberty Humane Society. LHS also officially took possession of the shelter and property under a 45-year lease with the city of Jersey City. The current facility is housed in a converted garage and has required constant renovations and multiple additions in order to meet the needs of an urban animal shelter & welfare organization. 

Liberty Humane Society now holds animal control & sheltering contracts with Jersey City, Bayonne and Hoboken. It is located across from the Liberty Science Center, at 235 Jersey City, Blvd, in Jersey City, NJ. The organization is governed by a board of directors which oversees the activities of Liberty Humane Society as set forth in its by-laws.

Mission statement
Liberty Humane Society's mission is to foster a community of compassion and respect, and provide animals in need with a chance at a lifelong, loving home.

Board of Directors
 Andy Siegel, President
 Alex Habib, Treasurer
 Norrice Raymaker, Secretary
 Michele Perotta, Member
 Christa Segalini, Member
 Rick Fremont, Member

Volunteering
Liberty Humane Society began as a completely volunteer-run organization and still maintains an active volunteer base. Volunteers walk dogs, socialize cats, help with adoption events and fund-raising activities. They host and attend wine tastings, dog walks, Yappy Hours, and many other events to help raise money and to bring the community together. Adoption events are hosted at local pet stores and community businesses that partner with LHS.

Programs & services

Pet adoption
The featured service of Liberty Humane Society is animal adoption. LHS works to re-home the unclaimed animals who come into its care. More than one thousand animals are adopted into new homes each year. Shelter pet profiles and adoption applications are accessible at www.libertyhumane.org/adopt.

Wellness clinic
The Liberty Humane Society offers low-cost wellness clinics each Wednesday. Services include vaccinations and tests for dogs and cats: Rabies, Distemper, Lepto, Lyme, Bordetella, Canine Influenza, Microchipping, Frontline Plus, Strongid, Feline Como Test, Heartworm. The list of available services is accessible at www.libertyhumane.org/low_cost_wellness.

References

External links

Hudson County, New Jersey
Animal shelters in the United States
Animal welfare organizations based in the United States